The trawl pipefish, Kimblaeus bassensis, is a species of pipefish found only in the Tasman Sea and the Bass Strait off of the southern coast of Australia, where it can be found at depths from . This species is the only known member of its genus.

References

Syngnathidae
Fish described in 1980
Taxa named by Charles Eric Dawson